George Cardell Briggs  (6 September 191015 March 2004) was the first Bishop of The Seychelles.

Born in Warrington, Briggs was educated at Worksop College and Sidney Sussex College, Cambridge. After studying at Cuddesdon College he was ordained deacon in 1934 and priest in 1935. He was a curate of St Alban's, Stockport until 1937 when he became a missionary priest in the Diocese of Masabi, Tanzania. In 1939 he became a member of the Oratory of the Good Shepherd. He was the Archdeacon of Newala from 1955 to 1964 and then Rector of St Alban's Dar-es-Salaam until 1969 when he became Warden of St Cyprian's Theological College, Masasi, his last post before ordination to the episcopate. He resigned his See in 1979 and returned to England as Assistant Bishop of Derby; he went to Mauritius the next year. He was afterwards an assistant priest in Mwatara, Tanzania, and an honorary assistant bishop in the Diocese of Worcester until 1990.

Briggs died in 2004, aged 93.

References

1910 births
Alumni of Sidney Sussex College, Cambridge
Anglican archdeacons in Africa
20th-century Anglican bishops in Africa
2004 deaths
Anglican bishops of Seychelles
British expatriates in Seychelles
Companions of the Order of St Michael and St George
English Anglican missionaries
Anglican missionaries in Tanzania
People educated at Worksop College
People from Warrington